Mihajlovo is a village in Serbia. It is located in the Zrenjanin municipality, in the Central Banat District, Vojvodina province. The village has a Hungarian ethnic majority (94.02%) and its population numbers 1,004 people (2002 census).

Historical population
1961: 1,409
1971: 1,252
1981: 1,318
1991: 1,169

References
Slobodan Ćurčić, Broj stanovnika Vojvodine, Novi Sad, 1996.

See also
List of places in Serbia
List of cities, towns and villages in Vojvodina

Populated places in Serbian Banat
Zrenjanin